Braman is a town in Kay County, Oklahoma, United States. The population was 217 at the 2010 census, a decline of 11.1 percent from the figure of 244 in 2000.

History
Braman was named for railroad developer Dwight Braman, when its post office was first established on April 22, 1898. In that year, the Kansas and Southeastern Railroad (which was bought by the Atchison, Topeka and Santa Fe Railroad in 1899, built a track from Hunnewell, Kansas to Braman. The town, located  inside the Kansas-Oklahoma state line, incorporated on January 9, 1899. There were 249 residents in 1900, growing to 300 by statehood in 1907.

In 1920, the population was 396 and the local economy was largely based on wheat farming. Oil was discovered nearby during the 1920s, briefly attracting a peak population of nearly five thousand, but the population dropped quickly to 507 in 1930.  This was the highest number ever recorded in the census for Braman. It has remained an agricultural center since then.

Geography

Demographics

As of the census of 2000, there were 244 people, 103 households, and 66 families residing in the town. The racial makeup of the town was 85.66% White, 0.41% African American, 6.56% Native American, and 7.38% from two or more races. Hispanic or Latino of any race were 3.28% of the population.

There were 103 households, out of which 31.1% had children under the age of 18 living with them, 49.5% were married couples living together, 11.7% had a female householder with no husband present, and 35.0% were non-families. 31.1% of all households were made up of individuals, and 7.8% had someone living alone who was 65 years of age or older. The average household size was 2.37 and the average family size was 2.99.

In the town, the population was spread out, with 25.4% under the age of 18, 6.1% from 18 to 24, 26.6% from 25 to 44, 29.5% from 45 to 64, and 12.3% who were 65 years of age or older. The median age was 39 years. For every 100 females, there were 92.1 males. For every 100 females age 18 and over, there were 93.6 males.

The median income for a household in the town was $27,841, and the median income for a family was $33,750. Males had a median income of $23,750 versus $21,667 for females. The per capita income for the town was $17,721. About 3.0% of families and 10.0% of the population were below the poverty line, including 5.0% of those under the age of eighteen and 24.0% of those 65 or over.

Notable person
 Dale DeWitt, the former majority leader of the Oklahoma House of Representatives, resides in Braman.

References

External links
 Encyclopedia of Oklahoma History and Culture - Braman
 Oklahoma Digital Maps: Digital Collections of Oklahoma and Indian Territory
 Ponca City Centennial Guide

Towns in Kay County, Oklahoma
Towns in Oklahoma